John Wood (4 November 1789 – 10 October 1856) was a British Whig politician, MP for Preston 1826–1832.

Early life
Wood was the son of Ottiwell Wood (1759–1847), a Manchester fustian manufacturer and Unitarian, and his wife Grace Grundy. He was baptised at Mosley Street Unitarian Chapel, Manchester, on 19 November 1789.

Intended for the Unitarian ministry, Wood entered the University of Glasgow in 1806, but left without taking a degree in 1808, and went into business in Liverpool. He joined William Corrie, son of Edgar Corrie, who soon went into partnership with his brother Edgar Corrie the younger, and trading as William and Edgar Corrie.

Wood then embarked on a legal career, entering the Inner Temple in 1820, and was called to the bar in 1825, practising as a barrister on the northern circuit.

Political career
Standing for election as a Whig in Preston in 1826, Wood was elected alongside Edward Smith-Stanley (the future Earl of Derby and three-time prime minister), defeating the Radical William Cobbett and the anti-Catholic candidate Robert Smith Barrie.

Wood consistently supported the Whig/Radical opposition, effectively led by Joseph Hume. As a dissenter, he supported religious liberty, advocating repeal of the Test Acts in 1827 and 1828, and supporting Catholic emancipation, which passed as the Roman Catholic Relief Act 1829.

In the 1830 Wood and Smith-Stanley overcame a challenge by the Radical Henry Hunt, but in the by-election following Smith-Stanley's appointment as Chief Secretary for Ireland (in which only Smith-Stanley's seat, not Wood's, was contested), Hunt defeated Smith-Stanley. Wood and Hunt were re-elected unopposed in 1831. Wood stood down at the election of 1832.

Later career
He served as Recorder of York 1832–1833, Chairman of the Board of Stamps and Taxes 1833–1838, Chairman of the Board of Revenue 1838–1849, and Chairman of the Board of Inland Revenue from 1849 until his death.

He was active in the management of University College London, where he was a member of the council from 1835, and chaired the management committee 1845–1856.

He died in Bath in 1856.

Family
On 9 December 1828, Wood married Elizabeth Serjeantson, daughter of Rev. James Serjeantson, rector of Kirkby Knowle, Yorkshire. They had two daughters.

References

External links 
 

1789 births
1856 deaths
Politicians from Manchester
Alumni of the University of Glasgow
Members of the Inner Temple
Whig (British political party) MPs for English constituencies
UK MPs 1826–1830
UK MPs 1830–1831
UK MPs 1831–1832
People from Edge Hill
Committee members of the Society for the Diffusion of Useful Knowledge